Sharurah is a town in Najran Province, southern Saudi Arabia, approximately 200 miles east of the town of Najran.

It is located in the Empty Quarter desert near the Yemeni border, and functions mainly as a border town. Sharurah had a population of 85,977 at the 2010 Census. It served by Sharurah Domestic Airport, a small airport with services to Riyadh, Abha and Jeddah.

Climate

References 

 
Populated places in Najran Province